Events from the year 1753 in Sweden

Incumbents
 Monarch – Adolf Frederick

Events

 17 February – Sweden replace the Julian calendar with the Gregorian calendar.
 1 May - Species Plantarum by Carl Linnaeus. 
 24 July - The Royal Swedish Academy of Letters, History and Antiquities is founded by Queen Louisa Ulrika.
 20 September – Inauguration of the new observatory of the Royal Swedish Academy of Sciences.
 - Carl Linnaeus names the Cannabis sativa. 
 - The new Royal Palace, Stockholm, is sufficiently ready for the Royal family to move in, and they leave the Wrangel Palace for their new residence. 
 - The Du Londel Troupe is established in Sweden.
 - The Kina slott is created and given to the queen as the birthday present.
 - A new school regulation is instituted in the capital, in which all the basic educational schools of the capital is to include the subjects writing, reading, mathematics, history, geography, essay-writing, nature science and drawing.
 - Creation of the Tankebyggarorden.

Births

 13 June – Johan Afzelius, chemist (died 1837) 
 2 July – Hedvig Eleonora von Fersen, courtier (died 1792) 
 16 September – Märta Helena Reenstierna, diarist (died 1841) 
 8 October - Sophia Albertina, Abbess of Quedlinburg, princess (died 1829) 
 - Jeanna von Lantingshausen, politically active countess (died 1809)

Deaths

 13 July – Sten Carl Bielke, official, scientist and member of the Swedish parliament  (born 1709) 
 
 
 - Hedvig Mörner, politically influential countess (born 1672) 
 26 October - Margareta von Ascheberg, landowner (born 1671)

References

 
Years of the 18th century in Sweden
Sweden